Bungo Stray Dogs The Movie: Beast is a Japanese 2022 live-action film directed by Koichi Sakamoto and written by Kafka Asagiri. Based on a light novel spin-off from the Bungo Stray Dogs manga by Asagiri, the movie is set in an alternate universe from the franchise.

Premise
The story follows Ryunosuke Akutagawa, a man who vows revenge on a man dressed in black in order to rescue his sister. However, as he is about to starve to death, a man from the Armed Detective Agency appears.

Cast

Shohei Hashimoto as Ryunosuke Akutagawa
Yūki Torigoe as Atsushi Nakajima
Masashi Taniguchi as Sakunosuke Oda
Teruma as Doppo Kunikida
Ryōki Nagae as Ranpo Edogawa
Kōsuke Kuwano as Junichirō Tanizaki
Hitoshi Horinouchi as Kenji Miyazawa
Ao Hirokawa as Akiko Yosano
Akari Saitō as Naomi Tanizaki
Rui Tabuchi as Osamu Dazai
Sakina Kuwae as Kyōka Izumi
Ayaka Konno as Gin
Keisuke Ueda as Chūya Nakahara
Mitsu Murata as Tatsuhiko Shibusawa
Yūta Kishimoto as Fyodor D.
Keisuke Minami as the orphanage director
Hirofumi Araki as Ango Sakaguchi

Production

A live-action film, Beast was confirmed in March 2020 to be in development. It is based on a light novel by Kafka Asagiri, who is providing the screenplay, while Koichi Sakamoto is directing the movie. While Yūki Torigoe (Atsushi Nakajima) and Shohei Hashimoto (Ryunosuke Akutagawa) are reprising their roles from the original plays, most of the remaining cast are new. Several actors have commented the film will have a different style from plays.

Taku Iwasaki is returning from the anime version to compose the live-action film's music, and the rock unit Granrodeo is also returning to contribute the theme song "Tokei-mawari no Torque" (Clockwise Torque). Iwasaki claimed he conceived a specific type of soundtrack to fit the live-action version of Bungo Stray Dogs which would stand out in contrast to the anime soundtrack. Granrodeo "tried to express the contrast between justice and evil in the music".

In charge of the script, Kafka Asagiri provided new content not present in the original Beast light novel, including more characters.

References

External links
Official website (Japanese)

2022 films
Japanese action films
2020s Japanese-language films